The Flag of Kenya is a tricolour of black, red, and green with two white edges imposed with a red, white and black Maasai shield and two crossed spears. The flag is based on that of Kenya African National Union and was officially adopted on 12 December 1963 after Kenya's independence.

Grammar
The Kenyan flag is on the black over red over the green flag of Kenya African National Union (KANU), the political party that led the fight for the independence of Kenya. Upon independence, the white fimbriation, symbolising peace and unity, and the shield were added. The meaning of the colours of the flag of Kenya match closely to those of the Pan-African flag adopted by the Universal Negro Improvement Association and African Communities League in 1920.

The 2010 revised edition of the Constitution of Kenya includes specifications of the Kenyan flag, located in the Second schedule, Article 9, paragraph 6.2.

Symbolism
The Kenyan flag includes symbols of unity, peace, and defence of the country. The color black represents the people of the Republic of Kenya, red for the bloodshed during the fight for independence, and green for the country's landscape and natural wealth. The white fimbriation was added later to symbolise peace, honesty, purity, and innocence. The black, red, and white traditional Maasai shield and two spears symbolise the defence of all the things mentioned above. Many of both colours and symbolic values are shared with the flag of South Sudan.

Design

The colours of the flag have been specified by the Kenya National Archives.

Variants

Historical presidential standards

Defense forces

Variants

Historical flags

See also 
List of flags of Kenya

References

Sources
Kenyan Flag at Get Kenya Online. Accessed 6 August 2006.
Flag Specifications at Kenya National Archives. Accessed 16 Feb 2006.

External links

 Kenya Naval Ensign
 Flag of Kenya – Flagscorner
 Flag of Kenya – Kenya Travel Tips

Flag
Flags of Africa
Flags introduced in 1963
Kenya